Lavant may refer to:

Lavant, Tyrol, Austria, a municipality
Lavant, West Sussex, a civil parish
Lavant railway station
Lavant (ward)
River Lavant, West Sussex, the winterbourne after which the village is named
Lavant (river), Carinthia, Austria
Lavant viaduct, a motorway bridge over the river
Lavant, Ontario, Canada, a community in the township of Lanark Highlands
Roman Catholic Diocese of Lavant, a former bishopric, suffragan of the Prince-archbishop of Salzburg
Christine Lavant (1915-1973), Austrian poet and novelist
Denis Lavant (born 1961), French actor

See also 
 Levant, a region in the Middle East
 Levant (disambiguation)